Myron Worobec is a Ukrainian-American international soccer player who earned one caps for the U.S. Olympic Team in 1967. Played in Pan Am games.  A prolific scorer he was named all-East, all-Area, all-America, a member of the U.S. Pan American team and a member of the U.S. Olympic team.  MVP of the American Soccer League (Div. 2) in 1966–67.

Myron is a member of the NJIT Soccer Hall of Fame.

Worobec played club soccer for the Newark Ukrainian Sitch.

Worobec was a Ukrainian immigrant to U.S.A.

Worobec lives in St. Louis with 3 children and 6 grandchildren.  He still is active in his grandchildren's soccer teams.  Myron plays competitive tennis 3 days a week.

References

Living people
Year of birth missing (living people)
American soccer players
American people of Ukrainian descent
Soviet emigrants to the United States
Association football defenders